The Lusitanian pine vole (Microtus lusitanicus) is a species of rodent in the family Cricetidae.
It is endemic to the northwestern half of the Iberian Peninsula where it occurs in central and northern Portugal, northwest Spain, and in the extreme south west of France.

References

Musser, G. G. and M. D. Carleton. 2005. Superfamily Muroidea. pp. 894–1531 in Mammal Species of the World a Taxonomic and Geographic Reference. D. E. Wilson and D. M. Reeder eds. Johns Hopkins University Press, Baltimore.

Microtus
Rodents of Europe
Mammals described in 1879
Taxa named by Zéphirin Gerbe
Taxonomy articles created by Polbot